Ivar Andreas Forn (born 24 June 1983) is a retired Norwegian football goalkeeper.

Forn hails from Kvæfjord and played for Harstad IL before joining FK Bodø/Glimt ahead of the 2008 season. He did not establish himself in the first team, and was in 2009 loaned out to Alta IF. In 2012, he joined Mjøndalen IF, and eventually played as a first-choice goalkeeper in their 2015 Tippeligaen stint. On 3 May 2016 he retired from football on top level.

Career statistics

References

1983 births
Living people
People from Kvæfjord
Norwegian footballers
Association football goalkeepers
FK Bodø/Glimt players
Alta IF players
Mjøndalen IF players
Eliteserien players
Norwegian First Division players
Sportspeople from Troms og Finnmark